Beatriz Sarlo (born 1942) is an Argentine literary and cultural critic.  She was also founding editor of the cultural journal Punto de Vista ("Point of View"). She became an Order of Cultural Merit laureate in 2009.

Biography
Beatriz Sarlo was born in 1942 and studied literature at the undergraduate and graduate levels at the University of Buenos Aires. The writer, critic, and dramatist David Viñas was an early mentor and influence.  In 1978, she co-founded  Punto de Vista which was one of the major dissident voices during the military regime which ended in 1983. Because of the authoritarian nature of the regime, Sarlo and her fellow contributors had to use pseudonyms, and subordinate political questions to aesthetic ones. Paradoxically, this entailed a rethinking of the political which moved Sarlo's thought away from an earlier tendency to Marxism and other forms of radicalism. She has continued to maintain a moderate-left political stance that refrains from promoting euphorias of free-market thought or populist solidarity.

Sarlo is a highly laurelled academic who also operates as a public intellectual. She has written both on traditional literary topics—her book on Jorge Luis Borges, published in 1993, is one of the seminal works on the great Argentine fabulist—but she has also worked in more cultural areas, such as feminism, the emergence of the modern Argentine city, and Argentina's divided sense of its place in Latin America. These various interests are linked by an overall concern with the intellectual and how the idea of the intellectual functions in contemporary discursive contexts. Sarlo is not a parochial or regional thinker, but participates in global debates occasioned by critical theory, postmodernity, and the destabilization of set political ideologies after the fall of Communism. She has warned, though, against the naive transnationalism seen in an earlier female Argentine intellectual, Victoria Ocampo. In some ways, Sarlo's project is analogous to the work of thinkers of the previous generation such as Angel Rama in its ability to traverse disciplinary and discursive boundaries, though Rama specifically has not been a huge influence on Sarlo.

She held the Chair of Contemporary Literature at the Faculty of Arts and Letters at the University of Buenos Aires. In 2001, she was denied a position as the equivalent of distinguished professor, in controversial circumstances. She has also taught at several US universities, held the Simón Bolívar chair at the University of Cambridge, and been a visiting fellow at the Wissenschaftskolleg zu Berlin. She also writes regularly for Argentine newspapers such as La Nación, Clarín (for which she writes a weekly column), and Página 12.

Falkland Islands remarks
In August 2021, Sarlo said during an interview that the Falkland Islands are British territory, sparking condemnation from veterans and government officials. Parts of the opposition defended her stance, as she said that she "cared very little" about criticism to her remarks. Sarlo said that the Falklands are like the south of Scotland and that the claims are founded before Argentina was formed as a nation. She also stated that 1982 invasion was a "national psychotic act".

Publications 
 
 [with Carlos Altamirano] Literatura-sociedad (Buenos Aires: Edicial, 1982). 
 [with Carlos Altamirano] Ensayos argentinos: de Sarmiento a la Vanguardia (Buenos Aires: Ceal, 1983; Buenos Aires: Ariel, 1997). 
 El imperio de los sentimientos: Narraciones de circulación periódica en la Argentina, 1917-1927 (Buenos Aires: Catálogos, 1985; 2000; Buenos Aires: Siglo XXI, 2011).  
 Una modernidad periférica: Buenos Aires, 1920 y 1930 (Buenos Aires: Nueva Visión, 1988). 
 [with Carlos Altamirano] Conceptos de sociología literaria (Buenos Aires: CEDAL [Centro Editor de América Latina], 1990).
 La imaginación técnica: Sueños modernos de la cultura argentina (Buenos Aires: Nueva Visión, 1992).
 Borges, un escritor en las orillas (1993; Buenos Aires: Ariel, 1995; 1998). 
 Escenas de la vida posmoderna: Intelectuales, arte y videocultura en la Argentina (Buenos Aires: Ariel, 1994; 2004). 
 Martín Fierro y su crítica: Antología (Buenos Aires: Centro editor de América Latina, 1994). 
 Instantáneas: Medios, ciudad y costumbres en el fin de siglo (Buenos Aires: Ariel, 1996). 
 La máquina cultural: Maestras, traductores y vanguardistas (Buenos Aires: Ariel, 1998). 
 Siete ensayos sobre Walter Benjamin (Buenos Aires: Fondo de Cultura Económica, 2000).  
 La batalla de las ideas, 1943-1973 (Buenos Aires: Ariel, 2001). 
 Tiempo presente (Buenos Aires: Siglo XXI, 2001). 
 La pasión y la excepción (Buenos Aires: Siglo XXI, 2003). 
 Tiempo pasado: Cultura de la memoria y giro subjetivo (Buenos Aires: Siglo XXI, 2005). 
 Escritos sobre literatura argentina (Buenos Aires, Siglo XXI, 2007). 
 La ciudad vista: Mercancías y cultura urbana (Buenos Aires, Siglo XXI, 2009). 
 La audacia y el cálculo: Kirchner 2003-2010 (Buenos Aires: Sudamericana, 2011). 
 Signos de Pasión: Claves de la novela sentimental del Siglo de las Luces a nuestros días (Buenos Aires: Biblos, 2012). 
 Ficciones Argentinas: 33 Ensayos (Buenos Aires: Mardulce, 2012). 
 Viajes: De la Amazonia a Malvinas (Buenos Aires: Seix Barral, 2014). 
 Zona Saer (Santiago: Ediciones Universidad Diego Portal, 2016).

English translations 
 
 Borges: A Writer on the Edge (Verso 2007)  
 Scenes from Postmodern Life (2001, tr. Jon Beasley-Murray) 
 The Technical Imagination: Argentina's Modern Dreams (2007)

Notes

External links
 Biography at Stanford University's website
 Punto de Vista online
 Beatriz Sarlo at Clarín
 Interview with Beatriz Sarlo, Barcelona Metropolis, Spring 2008.

Latin Americanists
Argentine literary critics
Women literary critics
Argentine essayists
Argentine women critics
20th-century Argentine women writers
20th-century Argentine writers
Living people
1942 births
Argentine women essayists
Corresponding Fellows of the British Academy